Nicole Rajičová or Rajic (born August 13, 1995) is a Slovak-American figure skater who represents Slovakia in ladies' singles. She is the 2014 CS Golden Spin of Zagreb bronze medalist, the 2013 Merano Cup silver medalist, the 2013 Bavarian Open bronze medalist, the 2013 Ice Challenge bronze medalist, and a five-time Slovak national champion (2013, 2015–2017, 2019).

She placed 24th at the 2014 Winter Olympics and 14th at the 2018 Winter Olympics.

Personal life 
Nicole Rajičová was born August 13, 1995, in Garden City, New York. She is also known as Nicole Rajic; Rajičová is the Slovak feminine form. Her parents, Anna and Tomislav Rajič (Tom Rajic), moved to the United States from Slovakia. She received her undergraduate degree from Fordham University's Gabelli School of Business.

Career

Early years
By the age of five, Rajičová began taking figure skating lessons in Long Island from Milada Kubikova-Stastny (Šťastná-Kubíková), a former Olympian for Czechoslovakia. Early in her career, she competed as Nicole Rajic in U.S. regional and domestic events.

2011–12 to 2012–13
Rajičová debuted internationally for Slovakia in December 2011 at the Golden Spin of Zagreb. She began appearing in ISU Junior Grand Prix (JGP) events in autumn 2012 and became the Slovak national champion at the 2013 Three Nationals Championships.

2013–14 season: Sochi Olympics
Rajičová competed at two JGP events in September 2013, placing eighth in Košice, Slovakia and fifteenth in Gdańsk, Poland. Her first senior ISU Championship was the European Championships in January 2014 in Budapest, Hungary. Ranked fourteenth in the short program, she advanced to the free skate and finished seventeenth. In March, she competed at the 2014 Winter Olympics in Sochi, Russia; she qualified for the free skate by placing twenty-first in the short program and finished twenty-fourth overall.

Rajičová just missed qualifying for the free skate at the 2014 World Championships in Saitama, Japan after placing twenty-fifth in the short program.

2014–15 season
During the 2014–15 JGP season, Rajičová placed fourth in Ljubljana, Slovenia in August and fourth in Zagreb, Croatia in October. In November, she competed for the first time on the ISU Challenger Series (CS), finishing sixth at the 2014 CS Ice Challenge. In December, she won the bronze medal at the 2014 CS Golden Spin of Zagreb.

In January, Rajičová finished eleventh at the 2015 European Championships in Stockholm, Sweden, having ranked eighth in the short program and twelfth in the free skate. In early March, she competed at the 2015 World Junior Championships in Tallinn, Estonia; she placed fifth in the short, thirteenth in the free, and eleventh overall. Later that month, she finished fifteenth in Shanghai, China at the 2015 World Championships after placing fourteenth in the short and fifteenth in the free.

2015–16 season: Grand Prix debut
Rajičová placed ninth at the 2015 CS Ondrej Nepela Trophy. Making her Grand Prix (GP) debut, she placed seventh at the 2015 Skate America and 2015 Cup of China. At the 2016 Europeans in Bratislava she placed twelfth, and at the 2016 Worlds in Boston she placed thirteenth.

2016–17 season 
Ranked seventh in the short, sixth in the free, and sixth overall, Rajičová achieved her career-best continental result at the 2017 European Championships in Ostrava, Czech Republic.

2017–18 season: Pyeongchang Olympics 
Rajičová was given two Grand Prix assignments for the season, the 2017 NHK Trophy, where she placed tenth, and the 2017 Skate America, where she placed ninth. At the 2018 European Championships in Moscow, she placed ninth in the short program and sixth in the free skate, finishing in sixth place.

At the 2018 Winter Olympics in Pyeongchang, South Korea, Rajičová again represented Slovakia.  She finished thirteenth in the short program and fifteenth in the free skate, ranking fourteenth overall.  She concluded the season at the 2018 World Championships in Milan, where she placed twenty-seventh and for the first time in four years did not qualify for the free skate.

2018–19 season 
Rajičová was assigned to two Grand Prix events, the 2018 Skate America and the 2018 Grand Prix of Helsinki, but withdrew from both of them, as well as the 2018 CS Ondrej Nepela Trophy.  Her participation in the remainder of the season was in doubt for some time afterward.  She returned to training in October following an eight-month hiatus, and won another Slovak national title.

Competing internationally for the first time at the 2019 European Championships, she placed fifth in the short program, and expressed happiness with the result, saying "two weeks ago, I didn’t know if I was going to compete because I wasn’t in the shape I wished I was in."  She placed twelfth in the free program, dropping to ninth overall, and said that the skate "started off quite well and then my legs collapsed.  It was quite a fight. I got so tired I couldn’t even handle double Axels. It is what it is. I just have to go and do more run-throughs."

2020–21 season 
Rajičová placed fifth at the 2021 Four National Championships, taking the Slovakian national title.

2021–22 season 
Rajičová attempted to qualify a berth for Slovakia at the 2022 Winter Olympics by competing at the 2021 CS Nebelhorn Trophy, but placed eighteenth, outside of qualification.

Programs

Results 
GP: Grand Prix; CS: Challenger Series; JGP: Junior Grand Prix

For Slovakia

For the United States

References

External links 

 
 
 
 

1995 births
Living people
People from Garden City, New York
Slovak female single skaters
American female single skaters
American people of Slovak descent
Figure skaters at the 2014 Winter Olympics
Figure skaters at the 2018 Winter Olympics
Olympic figure skaters of Slovakia
21st-century American women